Chatham-Kent—Leamington (formerly Chatham-Kent—Essex and Chatham—Kent Essex) is a provincial electoral district in southwestern, Ontario, Canada. It elects one member to the Legislative Assembly of Ontario.

It was created in 1999 from parts of Essex—Kent, Chatham-Kent and Essex South.

When the riding was created, it included all of Kent County south of the Thames River, the city of Chatham, the town of Leamington and the Township of Mersea Township.

In 2007, the boundaries did not change.

As a result of the 2012 federal boundary redistricting, the name of the district was changed to Chatham-Kent—Leamington.

Members of Provincial Parliament

This riding has elected the following members of the Legislative Assembly of Ontario:

Election results

	
	

		

|align="left" colspan=2|Liberal hold
|align="right"|Swing
|align="right"|  -3.16

^ Change based on redistributed results

2007 electoral reform referendum

Sources

Elections Ontario Past Election Results
Map of riding for 2018 election

Ontario provincial electoral districts
Chatham-Kent
Leamington, Ontario